António Carlos Bernardino Pedroto (born 19 October 1953) is a Portuguese former footballer who played as an attacking midfielder, and is a manager.

Playing career
Born in Lisbon, Pedroto started playing football with local S.L. Benfica. He began training with the first team in the 1972–73 season, which ended in Primeira Liga conquest, but his only league appearance for the club only came the following campaign.

After leaving Benfica, Pedroto represented always in the top division, where he amassed totals of 226 matches and 28 goals during 13 seasons, Vitória de Guimarães (two spells), C.S. Marítimo and Portimonense SC, retiring in June 1986 at nearly 33; with Vitória, he also appeared in three UEFA Cup editions.

Coaching career
Pedroto's first job as a head coach in the professionals was in 1990–91, as he led Sport Benfica e Castelo Branco to the fifth position in the second level, just one point shy of promotion. After one year in the lower leagues with Varzim SC, he was appointed at former club Vitória de Guimarães, helping them finish seventh in the top flight in his only full season.

Pedroto never again finished one season during the rest of his Portugal coaching career at the professional level, with the exception being 1993–94 with Guimarães (seventh place, top division) and 1995–96 with Gil Vicente FC (11th position, same tier). Subsequently, he moved to Angola and signed for Atlético Sport Aviação, winning the Girabola tournament three years in a row (2002–04) and finishing second in 2005.

Pedroto left Aviação in early January 2007, due to financial difficulties. The following day, he was appointed at fellow league side Atlético Petróleos Luanda.

In 2008, Pedroto made history in Angolan football as he won a record four national championships – eventually five – overtaking Mário Calado of Santos Futebol Clube de Angola. As ASA's manager he also conquered four Supercups, another best-ever.

Pedroto left Petro at the end of the 2010 season. He continued to work in the country in the following years, with G.D. Interclube and C.R. Caála.

References

External links

1953 births
Living people
Footballers from Lisbon
Portuguese footballers
Association football midfielders
Primeira Liga players
S.L. Benfica footballers
Vitória S.C. players
C.S. Marítimo players
Portimonense S.C. players
Portugal youth international footballers
Portuguese football managers
Primeira Liga managers
Liga Portugal 2 managers
Varzim S.C. managers
Vitória S.C. managers
Gil Vicente F.C. managers
S.C. Campomaiorense managers
Portimonense S.C. managers
Moreirense F.C. managers
G.D. Interclube managers
Portuguese expatriate football managers
Expatriate football managers in Angola
Portuguese expatriate sportspeople in Angola